Eburia quadrigeminata, the ivory-marked beetle or ivory-marked borer, is a species of beetle in the family Cerambycidae. The life span is 10–40 years.

References

External links
Images of the ivory-marked beetle

quadrigeminata
Beetles described in 1826